Owen Gill (born February 19, 1962) is a former American football running back who played professionally in the National Football League (NFL). He was selected by the Seattle Seahawks in the 2nd round (53rd overall pick) of the 1985 NFL Draft out of the University of Iowa. He played for the Indianapolis Colts (1985–1986) and the Los Angeles Rams (1987).

External links
Iowa Hawkeyes bio

1962 births
Living people
Sportspeople from London
Sportspeople from Brooklyn
Players of American football from New York City
English players of American football
American football running backs
Indianapolis Colts players
Los Angeles Rams players
Iowa Hawkeyes football players